Cecilia Romo, also known as Ceci Romo (5 December 1945 – 30 August 2020) was a Mexican film, theatrical, and television actress. Prior to her professional acting career, which began in the 1980s, she was a member of Mexico women's national basketball team during the 1960s. Romo, who appeared in more than 30 theater productions during her career, was often cast as rebellious or comedic characters. Her telenovela and television roles became popular throughout Mexico and Latin America during the 1990s.

Biography

Early life and career
Romo was born on 5 December 1945, in Mexico City. She was raised in Ciudad Juárez, Chihuahua. Her mother, Cecilia Santillan de Romo, was a high school teacher, while her father, Luis Romo Maconde, owned and operated several pharmacies and medical laboratories.

An athlete, Romo played for Mexico women's national basketball team during the 1960s. She then enrolled at the National Autonomous University of Mexico (UNAM) and received her bachelor's degree in 1978. Romo worked as an economist for the Mexican government before becoming a talent manager for advertising models.

Acting career
In the early 1980s, Romo received a phone call at her agency looking for extras for the American science fiction film, Dune, which was filming in Mexico at the time. Romo, who was 38-years old at the time, decided to sign up as an extra for film herself. She enjoyed the experience and quickly decided to pursue acting as a career. She was soon cast in the 1985 film, Los Náufragos del Liguria, which focused on a group of shipwreck survivors. Romo soon found on-screen acting roles in Mexican television during the mid and late 1980s as well, launching a decades-long professional TV career.

Romo was taller than most other television actresses, but became popular with audiences in Latin America and Mexico for her comedic facial expressions and gift for slapstick comedy. For example, in the 1990s telenovela De pocas, pocas pulgas, Romo enters a doctor's office, scaring the patient "with a syringe the size of a hunting rifle," according to the New York Times. In the TV Azteca telenovela Prófugas del destino (2010-2011), Romo utilized her trademark comedic facial expressions to play Madre Lourdes, a mother superior who discovers that several of the women in her convent are actually escaped fugitives disguised as nuns.

Romo also appeared in more than 30 professional theatrical plays and musicals, including the Spanish-language, Mexican productions of Hello, Dolly!, La Cage aux Folles, and Mame. In 2003, she appeared in the American film, Out of Time, starring Denzel Washington.

All of them! In comedies, dramas, theater, musicals." Actress , who appeared opposite her in several productions, noted that "She [Romo] played a lot of villains, but the roles that she was most known for were playful and cheeky, because she was like that." Romo's villainous roles included a witch and evil nurses and nuns.

Romo was known for a personal and professional sense of humor. On the set of her final television series, Como tú no hay 2 (2020), Romo began whistling like a stereotypical truck driver to catch the attention of the crew and her co-stars. She and the show's writers ultimately incorporated her whistle into her character, Doña Remedios, a traditional healer in a local market.

Death
Cecilia Romo died from complications of COVID-19 in Mexico City on 30 August 2020, after a 169-day battle with the illness during the COVID-19 pandemic in Mexico. She had been hospitalized several times during her treatment for COVID-19 and its complications, including anemia and three pulmonary hemorrhages. Romo died just five months after she filmed her final episode of Como tú no hay 2.

Romo was survived by her third husband, film editor Guillermo Coelho; two of her four children, diplomat Claudia Romo Edelman and Luis Roberto Ravelo Romo; and two grandchildren. Her two other children, Adriana González Romo and Raúl González Romo, both died from genetic disorders as toddlers. Romo's previous marriages, to civil engineer Raul Domingo González Soto and musician Alfonso Ravelo, ended in divorce.

Filmography

Telenovelas
 Rosa salvaje (1987–1988)
 La casa al final de la calle (1989) - Verónica
 Lo blanco y lo negro (1989) - Cristina Carvajal 
 Cadenas de amargura (1991) - Madre Superiora
 Valentina (1993) - Madre Eugenia
 Si Dios me quita la vida (1995)
 El premio mayor (1995–1996)
 Tu y yo (1996-1997) - Gudelia
 De pocas, pocas pulgas (2003)
 Marina (2006) - Madre Superiora
 Yo amo a Juan Querendón (2007)
 Amor sin maquillaje (2007)
 Juro que te amo (2008) - Olvido
 Mañana es para siempre (2008–2009) - Enfermera
 Prófugas del destino (2010) - Madre Lourdes
 Vivir a destiempo (2013) - Úrsula 
 Como tú no hay 2 (2020) - Doña Remedios

Other television series
 La hora marcada (1988)
 La telaraña (1990)
 Papá soltero (1993)
 Que chavas (1994)
 Aquí está la Chilindrina (1994) - Sor Gertrudis
 Desde Gayola (2002) - Menopausica
 Mujer, casos de la vida real (1994-2006)
 ¡Que madre tan padre! (2006) - Señora Bueno
 Mujeres asesinas (2009) - Angeles Chata Bovela
 La rosa de Guadalupe (2008-2011) - Beatriz/Amparo/Martha/Felicia
 Como dice el dicho (2016) - Sarita
 Un día cualquiera (2016) - Tisibe
 Silvia Pinal, frente a ti (2019)

Films
 Los náufragos del Liguria (1985)
 El segundo aire (2001)
 Out of Time (2003)
 Fantasías (2003) - Michelle
 Corazón marchito (2007) - Isela
 Rock Marí (2010) - Edna
 Luz azul (2010) (short film)
 Amante de lo ajeno (2012) - Elvira

References

External links
 

1945 births
2020 deaths
Mexican stage actresses
Mexican television actresses
Mexican telenovela actresses
Mexican film actresses
Mexican women's basketball players
Actresses from Mexico City
People from Ciudad Juárez
National Autonomous University of Mexico alumni
Deaths from the COVID-19 pandemic in Mexico